417th may refer to:

417th Bombardment Group, inactive United States Air Force unit
417th Bombardment Squadron a United States Air Force unit
417th Flight Test Squadron (417 FLTS), part of the 412th Test Wing based at Edwards Air Force Base, California
417th Weapons Squadron, inactive United States Air Force unit

See also
417 (number)
417, the year 417 (CDXVII) of the Julian calendar
417 BC